Events in the year 1924 in China.

Incumbents 
 President – Cao Kun until October 30, Duan Qirui
 Premier – Gao Lingwei until January 12, Sun Baoqi until July 2, Yan Huiqing until October 31, Huang Fu

Events
 June 16 – Whampoa Military Academy is founded in China.
 September 15 – November 3 – Second Zhili–Fengtian War: conflict in the Republic of China's Warlord Era between the Zhili and Fengtian cliques for control of Beijing.
 August–October - Canton Merchants' Corps Uprising
 October - Beijing Coup, coup d'état by Feng Yuxiang against Chinese President Cao Kun, leader of the Zhili clique. Feng called it the Capital Revolution. The coup occurred at a crucial moment in the Second Zhili–Fengtian War and allowed the pro-Japanese Fengtian clique to defeat the previously dominant Zhili clique

Births 
January 31 – Irene Chou
February 6 – Jin Yong
July – Wang Huo
August – Huang Hongjia
September 1 – Yuan-Shih Chow
September 24 – Shi Suxi
October 4 – Samuel Lamb, Chinese Christian pastor (d. 2013)
November – Wang Zhenyi
November – Tsai Wan-lin, Taiwanese businessman (d. 2004)
December – Qiao Shi
Yan Jinxuan
Li Han (aviator)

Deaths 
June 5 – Qian Nengxun
October 9 – Lin Shu
November 12 – Tian Wenlie

See also
Warlord Era
First Zhili–Fengtian War
Zhang Zuolin

References

 
Years of the 20th century in China